Ravindra Natya Grah is a theatre auditorium and exhibition hall located in Indore, Madhya Pradesh. The theater is named after Rabindranath Tagore who became the first non-European to win the Nobel Prize. It is run by Indore Municipal Corporation and has with the capacity of 900 persons with a parking facilities and also has Hotel Apsara in its campus. Its main venue to host public and private functions, magic shows, dramas etc. in Indore.

References

See also
 Wikimapia
 City portal at Govt. of India info. website
 
 

Theatres in Indore